Calvin de Haan (born May 9, 1991) is a Canadian professional ice hockey defenceman for the Carolina Hurricanes of the National Hockey League (NHL). He was selected 12th overall by the New York Islanders at the 2009 NHL Entry Draft.

Early life
De Haan was born and raised in Carp, Ontario with his younger brother Evan and parents Bill and Kathy. He attended Huntley Centennial Public School and All Saints Catholic High School growing up.

Playing career

Amateur
De Haan was drafted by the Oshawa Generals of the Ontario Hockey League (OHL) in the third round, 50th overall, at the 2007 OHL Priority Selection. Prior to joining the Generals, he played one season with the Kemptville 73's of the Central Junior A Hockey League. He was named the Rookie of the Year in the 2007–08 season after scoring 42 points in 58 games. In his rookie season with the Generals in 2008–09, he finished second on the team in scoring with 63 points, scoring eight goals and adding 55 assists. The Generals named him their top rookie and top defenceman, while he was also selected to play in the OHL All-Star Game and the 2009 CHL Top Prospects Game.

Ranked 25th by the NHL Central Scouting Bureau heading into the 2009 NHL Entry Draft, de Haan expected to be a late first, or early second round, selection. He was eventually selected by the New York Islanders, who made a trade to acquire the 12th overall pick, which they used to draft him.

The following season, de Haan required surgery to repair a torn labrum in his shoulder and was ruled out for the rest of the season.

Professional

de Haan turned professional during the 2011–12 AHL season, appearing in 56 games for the Bridgeport Sound Tigers. de Haan made his NHL debut with the Islanders that season, on December 15 against the Dallas Stars. De Haan was sent back to the AHL following his debut and was named to the 2012 AHL All-Star Team.

While playing 17 games for the Sound Tigers during the 2013–14 AHL season, de Haan also skated in 51 games for the Islanders, and scored his first career NHL goal against the Toronto Maple Leafs in a 5–3 victory on January 7.
On July 15, 2014, the Islanders re-signed de Haan to a three-year, $5.9 million contract. de Haan became a regular on the Islanders blueline the following season, appearing in 65 games.

On August 2, 2017, the Islanders re-signed de Haan to a one-year, $3.3 million contract. The two sides were set for an arbitration meeting that afternoon, with the deal being completed in the morning. During the season, de Haan suffered a lower body injury in a game against the Los Angeles Kings and was ruled out indefinitely for the rest of the season. de Haan missed the rest of the 49 games recovering from the required surgery.

On July 3, 2018, de Haan signed a four-year, $18.2 million contract with the Carolina Hurricanes. In his first season with the club in 2018–19, de Haan strengthened a dynamic Hurricanes blueline, adding 1 goal and 13 assists in 74 regular season games. Helping Carolina return to the post-season for the first time in 10 years, he appeared in a career high 12 playoff games in  reaching the Eastern Conference Finals.

On June 24, 2019, de Haan's tenure with the Hurricanes ended as he was traded along with Aleksi Saarela to the Chicago Blackhawks in exchange for Gustav Forsling and Anton Forsberg. However, he played a mere 29 games the following year before undergoing season-ending surgery on his right shoulder.

As a free agent at the conclusion of his contract with the Blackhawks, de Haan remained un-signed over the summer. Prior to the  season, de Haan returned to the Hurricanes organization initially on a tryout basis before signing a one-year, $850,000 contract on October 2, 2022.

International play

De Haan first represented the Canadian junior team at the 2009 IIHF World U18 Championships, scoring six assists in six games. He won a silver medal at the 2010 World Junior Ice Hockey Championships, though he missed two games after suffering a head injury in a game against Switzerland. On November 29, 2010, he was named to the 2011 Canadian World Junior Team selection camp for the second time, one of only four returning members from the 2010 silver-medal team. On December 19, 2010, de Haan was named an alternate captain to Ryan Ellis of the Windsor Spitfires for the 2011 Canadian junior team, along with Brayden Schenn of the Brandon Wheat Kings and Jared Cowen of the Spokane Chiefs, his fellow returnees.

Career statistics

Regular season and playoffs

International

References

External links
 

1991 births
Living people
Bridgeport Sound Tigers players
Canadian expatriate ice hockey players in the United States
Canadian ice hockey defencemen
Carolina Hurricanes players
Chicago Blackhawks players
Ice hockey people from Ottawa
National Hockey League first-round draft picks
New York Islanders draft picks
New York Islanders players
Oshawa Generals players